The 2005 IIHF World Championship Division II  was an international ice hockey tournament run by the International Ice Hockey Federation.  The tournament was contested from April 4 to April 16, 2005. Participants in this tournament were separated into two separate tournament groups. The Group A tournament was contested in Zagreb, Croatia. Group B's games were played in Belgrade, Serbia and Montenegro. Croatia and Israel finished atop of Group A and Group B respectively, gaining promotion to Division I for 2006. While Turkey finished last in Group A and Iceland last in Group B and were relegated to Division III for 2006.

Participants

Group A

Group B

Group A tournament

Standings

Fixtures
All times local.

Scoring leaders
List shows the top ten skaters sorted by points, then goals.
Source: IIHF.com

Leading goaltenders
Only the top five goaltenders, based on save percentage, who have played 40% of their team's minutes are included in this list.
Source: IIHF.com

Group B tournament

Standings

Fixtures
All times local.

Scoring leaders
List shows the top ten skaters sorted by points, then goals.
Source: IIHF.com

Leading goaltenders
Only the top five goaltenders, based on save percentage, who have played 40% of their team's minutes are included in this list.
Source: IIHF.com

References

IIHF World Championship Division II
3
IIHF
International ice hockey competitions hosted by Croatia
IIHF World Championship Division Ii
International ice hockey competitions hosted by Serbia and Montenegro
World
2000s in Belgrade
2000s in Zagreb
International sports competitions in Belgrade
Sports competitions in Zagreb